WGMA may refer to:

 WCYZ, a radio station (99.7 FM) licensed to serve Silver Springs Shore, Florida, United States, which held the call sign WGMA from 2013 to 2022
 WLQY, a radio station (1320 AM) licensed to serve Hollywood, Florida, which held the call sign WGMA from the mid-1960s to 1980